Shane Beatty is a Canadian gridiron football coach. Beatty served as the head coach of the CJFL's Westshore Rebels from 2015 to 2022  and Okanagan Sun from 2013 to 2015.  He served as the head football coach at West Virginia University Institute of Technology in Montgomery, West Virginia from 2006 to 2007, compiling a record of 2-20

References

Year of birth missing (living people)
Living people
Canadian football linebackers
Canadian Junior Football League coaches
Canadian Junior Football League players
West Virginia Tech Golden Bears football coaches
Junior college football coaches in the United States